Angophora robur, commonly known as the sandstone rough-barked apple or the broad-leaved sandstone apple, is a species of small tree that is endemic to a small area in New South Wales. It has rough, fibrous bark on the trunk and branches, lance-shaped to egg-shaped or oblong adult leaves, flower buds in groups of three or seven, white or creamy white flowers and cup-shaped to bell-shaped fruit.

Description

Taxonomy and naming
Angophora robur was first formally described in 1990 by Lawrie Johnson and Ken Hill in the journal Telopea from specimens they collected near Kremnos Creek on the Glenreagh - Grafton Road in 1984. Genetic analysis shows it to be closely related to smudgee (Angophora woodsiana).

Distribution and habitat
Sandstone rough-barked apple has a limited distribution near the coast of northern New South Wales along a sandstone belt running from near Glenreagh, north-west of Coffs Harbour to Coaldale north-west of Grafton. It grows in woodland on shallow sandstone soils.

Conservation status
This eucalypt is listed as "vulnerable" under the Australian Government Environment Protection and Biodiversity Conservation Act 1999 and the New South Wales Government Threatened Species Conservation Act 1995. The main threats to the species are clearing for agriculture, too-frequent fires, widening of roads and timber harvesting.

References

robur
Flora of New South Wales
Trees of Australia
Plants described in 1990